The 1914 New York Giants season was the franchise's 32nd season. The team finished in second place in the National League with an 84–70 record, 10½ games behind the "Miracle Braves." They had finished first the three previous years.

This team featured two Hall of Fame pitchers: Christy Mathewson, one of the greatest ever, and Rube Marquard, whose selection is considered by some to be controversial.

Regular season 
The offense scored the most runs in the league, even though no individual player drove in more than 79. The eight starters, however, all had an OPS+ of over 100. George Burns led the team with a .303 average and walked 89 times en route to a .403 on-base percentage.

Season standings

Record vs. opponents

Roster

Player stats

Batting

Starters by position 
Note: Pos = Position; G = Games played; AB = At bats; H = Hits; Avg. = Batting average; HR = Home runs; RBI = Runs batted in

Other batters 
Note: G = Games played; AB = At bats; H = Hits; Avg. = Batting average; HR = Home runs; RBI = Runs batted in

Pitching

Starting pitchers 
Note: G = Games pitched; IP = Innings pitched; W = Wins; L = Losses; ERA = Earned run average; SO = Strikeouts

Other pitchers 
Note: G = Games pitched; IP = Innings pitched; W = Wins; L = Losses; ERA = Earned run average; SO = Strikeouts

Relief pitchers 
Note: G = Games pitched; W = Wins; L = Losses; SV = Saves; ERA = Earned run average; SO = Strikeouts

Awards and honors

League top five finishers 
George Burns
 NL leader in runs scored (100)
 NL leader in stolen bases (62)
 #2 in NL in on-base percentage (.403)
 #3 in NL in walks drawn (89)

Rube Marquard
 #2 in NL in losses (22)

Jeff Tesreau
 #2 in NL in wins (26)
 #2 in NL in strikeouts (189)

References

External links
1914 New York Giants season at Baseball Reference

New York Giants (NL)
San Francisco Giants seasons
New York Giants season
1914 in sports in New York City
1910s in Manhattan
Washington Heights, Manhattan